Parapoynx affinialis is a moth in the family Crambidae. It was described by Achille Guenée in 1854. It is found in Egypt and from the Middle East to India. It has also been recorded from Australia.

References

Acentropinae
Moths described in 1854